Nemacheilus is a genus of stone loaches native to Asia.

Species 
There are currently 44 recognized species in this genus:
 Nemacheilus anguilla Annandale, 1919 (eel loach)
 Nemacheilus arenicolus Kottelat, 1998
 Nemacheilus banar Freyhof & Serov, 2001
 Nemacheilus binotatus H. M. Smith, 1933
 Nemacheilus chrysolaimos (Valenciennes, 1846)
 Nemacheilus cleopatra Freyhof & Serov, 2001
 Nemacheilus corica (F. Hamilton, 1822) (incertae sedis, most likely in this genus)
 Nemacheilus doonensis (Tilak & Husain, 1977)
 Nemacheilus drassensis (Tilak, 1990)
 Nemacheilus elegantissimus P. K. Chin & Samat, 1992
 Nemacheilus fasciatus (Valenciennes, 1846) (Barred loach)
 Nemacheilus inglisi Hora, 1935
 Nemacheilus jaklesii (Bleeker, 1852) (species inquirenda in this genus)
 Nemacheilus kaimurensis Husain & Tilak, 1998 (incertae sedis, most likely in this genus)
 Nemacheilus kapuasensis Kottelat, 1984
 Nemacheilus keralensis (Rita, Bănărescu & Nalbant, 1978) (Kerala loach)
 Nemacheilus longipectoralis Popta, 1905
 Nemacheilus longipinnis C. G. E. Ahl, 1922
 Nemacheilus longistriatus Kottelat, 1990
 Nemacheilus lunanensis  Li & Xia, 1987 
 Nemacheilus marang Hadiaty & Kottelat, 2010
 Nemacheilus masyai H. M. Smith, 1933 (Arrow loach)
 Nemacheilus monilis Hora, 1921 (incertae sedis, most likely in this genus)
 Nemacheilus olivaceus Boulenger, 1894
 Nemacheilus ornatus Kottelat, 1990
 Nemacheilus oxianus  Kessler, 1877 (Amu-Darya stone loach) 
 Nemacheilus pallidus Kottelat, 1990
 Nemacheilus papillos H. H. Tan & Kottelat, 2009
 Nemacheilus papillosus (Perugia, 1893) (species inquirenda in this genus)
 Nemacheilus paucimaculatus Bohlen & Šlechtová, 2011
 Nemacheilus pfeifferae (Bleeker, 1853)
 Nemacheilus platiceps Kottelat, 1990
 Nemacheilus rueppelli  (Sykes, 1839) (Mongoose loach) 
 Nemacheilus saravacensis Boulenger, 1894
 Nemacheilus selangoricus Duncker, 1904 (Grey-banded loach)
 Nemacheilus shehensis Menon, 1987
 Nemacheilus shuangjiangensis (S. Q. Zhu & S. H. Wang, 1985)
 Nemacheilus singhi (Menon, 1987)
 Nemacheilus spiniferus Kottelat, 1984
 Nemacheilus stigmofasciatus Arunachalam & Muralidharan, 2009 (incertae sedis, most likely in this genus)
 Nemacheilus subfusca (McClelland, 1839) 
 Nemacheilus tebo Hadiaty & Kottelat, 2009
 Nemacheilus troglocataractus Kottelat & Géry, 1989 (Blind cave loach)
 Nemacheilus tuberigum Hadiaty & Siebert, 2001
 Nemacheilus yingjiangensis  Zhu, 1982
Nemacheilus zonatus

References 

 
Taxonomy articles created by Polbot